Tilia nobilis, the noble lime, is a species of flowering plant in the family Malvaceae, native to south-central China. An octoploid, it has large leaves and floral bracts. It is occasionally available from specialty nurseries.

References

nobilis
Trees of China
Endemic flora of China
Flora of South-Central China
Plants described in 1915